Dawn Dumont is the pen name of Dawn Marie Walker, a Plains Cree writer, former lawyer, comedian and journalist from the Okanese First Nation in Saskatchewan, Canada. In 2022, she became the subject of nation wide attention when she was the subject of multiple criminal investigations across the United States and Canada after allegedly kidnapping her seven-year-old son and faking their death and disappearances.

Career

Writing
Her first book, Nobody Cries at Bingo (2011), is a fictionalized, humorous account of her own life growing up on a reserve. Dumont says that the book was inspired by the writing of David Sedaris. In 2012 it was shortlisted for an Alberta Readers' Choice Award and a Robert Kroetsch City of Edmonton Award, and selected for the Canadian Children's Book Centre's Best Books for Kids and Teens. In 2021, the French translation of the book (translated by Daniel Grenier) was nominated for the Governor General's Award for English to French translation at the 2020 Governor General's Awards.

She followed up with Rose's Run (2014), the story of Rose Okanese, a single mother, who enters a marathon in an effort to boost her self-esteem. Writing in Pacific Rim Review of Books, Chuck Barker described the novel as "integral Canadian literature" and praised Dumont's "self-depreciating, honest, comprehensive, and confidential" sense of humour. This book won the 2015 Saskatchewan Book Award for Fiction.

In 2017 she changed formats, publishing a collection of short stories titled Glass Beads. In more than twenty stories, Dumont explores the relationships between four First Nations characters over a period of two decades. Shannon Webb-Campbell, reviewing the book in The Malahat Review, notes that "much like beadwork, each strand or story stands on its own, but can only be fully formed in relation to others." Glass Beads was shortlisted for four Saskatchewan Book Awards, including the Book of the Year Award and the Indigenous Peoples' Writing Award. It won the Fiction Award.

In 2022, her book, The Prairie Chicken Dance Tour, was shortlisted for the Stephen Leacock Memorial Medal for Humour. The announcement of the shortlist was made while Dumont was still considered a missing person.

Other
In addition to her books, Dumont has performed as a stand-up comic and performed at the Comic Strip in New York. She was a story editor for the animated APTN program, By the Rapids, and she wrote regular columns in Eagle Feather News and the Saskatoon StarPhoenix hired Dumont as a twice monthly columnist in 2015.

Dumont served as the Executive Operating Officer of the Federation of Sovereign Indigenous Nations (FSIN) starting in 2016 and was the longest serving CEO in the organization’s history.

In 2021, Dumont, as Dawn Dumont Walker, ran as a candidate for the federal Liberal Party in Saskatoon's Saskatoon-University riding. She lost but received ten percent of the vote.

Personal life
Dumont was born and raised on the Okanese First Nation. She earned a Bachelor of Arts degree in English from the University of Saskatchewan in 1995. She holds a law degree from Queen's University.

 she has one child, Vincent Jansen.

Disappearance and criminal charges
On July 24, 2022, Dumont and her seven-year-old son were reported missing after Dumont's vehicle and personal items were found empty near Saskatoon's Chief Whitecap Park. Dumont's friends were especially concerned as she had two pets  that had been locked inside for days.  Several investigations were launched, including by the RCMP. The Federation of Sovereign Indigenous Nations issued an amber alert for the child on social media.

During the investigation, Dumont's friends and family heavily implied foul play. FSIN Vice Chief Heather Bear alleged that Dumont had previously been a victim of domestic violence. However, Bear did not make any formal allegations. Dumont's friend, Eleanore Sunchild, also noted that Dumont had reported allegations of violence in her previous relationship to the police, who she claims did nothing. Sunchild is quoted saying “It’s totally out of character, She’s one of the most responsible people I know. She would not disappear.” 

While she was considered missing, a rally and a candlelight vigil were held in Saskatchewan to grieve and support the community. Dumont had been an advocate for missing and murdered Indigenous women and girls and her disappearance was linked with that particular human rights crisis. The child's paternal family set up a GoFundMe campaign to help with search costs. After Dumont and her son were found, donations were capped; all unused funds were donated to help support other families of missing children.

On August 5, 2022, following a joint investigation by Saskatoon Police Service and Homeland Security, Dumont and her son were found at a rental in Oregon City, Oregon. Court documents filed in Oregon alleged that Dumont faked her death and that of her son in what they describe as an elaborate scheme to illegally enter the country.

The U.S. Department of Homeland Security has charged her with the felony offence of knowingly producing a passport of another person and a misdemeanour charge of possessing identification that was stolen or produced illegally. She was also charged with aggravated identity theft. In Canada, she is charged with parental abduction and public mischief. If the American authorities were to drop identity theft charges, Dumont could then face that charge in Canada, where the alleged identity theft occurred.

Dumont's friends and family have urged compassion, stating that the situation is complex and requires patience. Idle No More launched a GoFundMe campaign to help fund Dumont's legal expenses. While detained in the US, Dumont made a statement claiming that she left because she feared for her and her son's safety. She also cited previous domestic abuse allegations against her ex, alleging that they were not taken seriously by Saskatchewan police. Saskatchewan police said they had investigated the claims but found no evidence. Critics of Dumont state that her ex and her have been separated for four years and that she made domestic abuse allegations only after entering a losing custody battle.

Dumont, who remains in custody, was set to appear in court in Oregon on September 7, 2022. Following hearings in the United States, an informal agreement was reached that would have American authorities transfer Dumont to Canadian authorities without a formal extradition process. Her son is with his father in Canada.

On August 29, 2022, Dumont made her first appearance in court in Saskatchewan. At an FSIN news conference that day, several women spoke in favor of Dumont and critiqued the legal system, restating claims that Dumont is a survivor of domestic violence. The women who spoke asserted that Dumont should be released from custody. A support rally was held prior to that hearing outside of the courthouse. Supporters reiterated their wishes that Dumont be released from custody, though the Crown maintains their opposition to her release. She was granted bail in September 2022. Her US court appearance has been postponed in light of her charges in Canada.

Dawn was released into house arrest on September 2nd, 2022, following her bail hearing. On November 15 she was arrested on new charges in relation to identity theft, fraud and forgery. Dumont elected to proceed with a trial by judge and waived her right to a preliminary hearing. She pleaded not guilty to all charges (public mischief, parental abduction and identity fraud) in January 2023.

Works

See also
 List of solved missing person cases

References

External links
Dawn Dumont at Thistledown Press 

1970s births
Living people
2020s missing person cases
21st-century Canadian novelists
21st-century Canadian short story writers
21st-century Canadian women writers
21st-century First Nations writers
21st-century pseudonymous writers
Canadian women novelists
Canadian women short story writers
Cree people
First Nations novelists
First Nations women writers
Formerly missing people
Missing person cases in Canada
Pseudonymous women writers
Queen's University at Kingston alumni
University of Saskatchewan alumni
Writers from Saskatchewan
Date of birth missing (living people)
Place of birth missing (living people)